Hacıgelen is a village in the Lapseki District of Çanakkale Province in Turkey. Its population is 91 (2021).

References

Villages in Lapseki District